Israel competed at the 2004 Summer Paralympics in Athens, Greece. The team included 24 athletes, 21 men and 3 women. Competitors from Israel won 13 medals, including 4 gold, 4 silver and 5 bronze to finish 32nd in the medal table.

Medallists

Sports

Athletics

Men's field

Cycling

Men's road

Equestrian

Team

Shooting

Men

Swimming

Men

Women

Table tennis

Wheelchair tennis

Quads

References 

Nations at the 2004 Summer Paralympics
2004
Summer Paralympics